The 2014 Kazakhstan Cup Final was the 23rd final of the Kazakhstan Cup. The match was contested by Kairat and Aktobe at Astana Arena in Astana. The match was played on 22 November 2014 and was the final match of the competition.

Background
Kairat played a record 8th Kazakhstan Cup-final. They won 5 finals, the last time in the 2003 season against Tobol. Their last defeat in the final was in 2005, having lost 2–1 to Zhenis.

It was the 3rd final for Aktobe. They had won only once, in the 2008 season against Alma-Ata. Their other defeat in the final was in 1994, having lost 1–0 to Vostok.

Kairat and Aktobe played twice during the league season. On May 1, 2015 Aktobe won the first game 1–0 at Central Stadium. The only goal in the match was scored by Marat Khairullin. On June 6, 2015 Kairat crushed Aktobe with the score 7-1. Goals were scored by: Gerard Gohou (hat trick), Josip Knezevic (double), Zaurbek Pliyev, Bauyrzhan Islamkhan (Kairat) and Oleksiy Antonov (Aktobe).

Route to the Final

Kairat

Aktobe

Match

Details

Statistics

References

2014
2014 domestic association football cups
2014 in Kazakhstani football
FC Aktobe matches
FC Kairat matches